In point-set topology, the composant of a point p in a continuum A is the union of all proper subcontinua of A that contain p.  If a continuum is indecomposable, then its composants are pairwise disjoint.  The composants of a continuum are dense in that continuum.

References
 
 

Continuum theory